María Angélica Pérez (17 August 1897 – 20 May 1932) was an Argentine Roman Catholic professed religious and a member of the Daughters of Our Lady of the Garden. Upon becoming a nun she assumed the name of "María Crescentia". She also was known to ill people as "Sister Sweetness".

Pérez worked with the sick people of Argentina and was later relocated to Chile to continue her work. In 1932 she died of lung disease and was buried in Argentina; her remains were moved back to her homeland some decades later.

Her beatification cause received the approval of Pope Benedict XVI and she was beatified on 17 November 2012 in Buenos Aires; Cardinal Angelo Amato presided over the celebration on the pope's behalf.

Life
María Angélica Pérez was born on 17 August 1897 in Buenos Aires to Spanish immigrants Augustín Pérez and Ema Rodriguez (who married in 1889) as the fifth of eleven children. Among all her siblings there were four brothers and two sisters. She was raised on a farm and helped her father with work around the farm. She was a pious child, known for her devotion to the faith.

Four siblings before her  who died in childhood  were born while living in Uruguay. Among her siblings were brothers Agustín and José María and sisters Aída and María Luisa.

Pérez entered a religious congregation on 31 December 1915 and received the habit on 2 September 1916; she assumed the new name of "María Crescentia". She made her vows on 7 September 1918. She served as both a teacher and a catechist to children and from 1924 to 1928 worked in a hospital tending to patients afflicted with tuberculosis and also sick children.

She moved to Mar del Plata in 1925 to care for the ill and was infected with lung disease and so arrangements were moved for her to be transferred to a change of environment. As her health declined she was assigned to a hospital in Vallenar in Chile in 1928 and was perceived as a source of happiness and comfort to the patients.

Pérez died in 1932 in hospital of lung disease. In 1966, her remains were found to be incorrupt upon inspection and were taken to Quillata. She was reinterred in the college chapel in Huerto de Pergamino in her homeland of Argentina on 26 July 1986.

Beatification
The beatification process commenced in a diocesan process on 30 June 1987 in which those involved were required to investigate Pérez's life and her personal holiness. The process also saw the accumulation of documentation pertaining to her life and later closed on 3 October 1989. This process took place despite the fact that the Congregation for the Causes of Saints did not grant their formal approval to the initiation of the cause until 5 December 1989 - this conferred upon her the title of Servant of God.

The process was deemed to have completed its work according to the set criteria in 1993 which allowed for the Congregation for the Causes of Saints to begin their own line of investigation into the cause. The postulation submitted the Positio - biographical details and attesting to her beatification cause - to Rome in 1997.

On 22 June 2004 she was proclaimed to be Venerable after Pope John Paul II acknowledged the fact that Pérez had lived a model life of heroic virtue.

The miracle needed for her beatification was investigated in the diocese of its origin from 25 August 1999 until 20 April 2000; it received the validation of Roman officials on 16 November 2001 and could thus proceed to the following stages of investigation. It was on 19 December 2011 that Pope Benedict XVI approved the 1995 healing of María Sara Pane from Hepatitis-A.

Her beatification was celebrated in Buenos Aires on 17 November 2012 and Cardinal Angelo Amato presided over it on the behalf of Benedict XVI.

The current postulator of the cause is Enrico Venanzi.

References

External links
Hagiography Circle
Saints SQPN
Sister Cresencia

1897 births
1932 deaths
20th-century venerated Christians
20th-century Argentine people
Beatifications by Pope Benedict XVI
Argentine beatified people
20th-century Argentine Roman Catholic nuns
Deaths from lung disease
People from Buenos Aires
Venerated Catholics by Pope John Paul II